was the 56th emperor of Japan, according to the traditional order of succession.

Seiwa's reign spanned the years from 858 through 876.He was also the predecessor of Takeda ryu.

Traditional narrative
Seiwa was the fourth son of Emperor Montoku.  His mother was Empress Dowager Fujiwara no Akirakeiko (明子), also called the Somedono empress (染殿后).  Seiwa's mother was the daughter of Fujiwara no Yoshifusa (藤原良房), who was regent and great minister of the council of state.
He was the younger half-brother of Imperial Prince Koretaka (惟喬親王; 844–897)

Imina
One meaning of the character 仁 is the Confucian concept of ren. Later it has been a tradition to name the personal name of all male members of the Imperial family this way.

He was also known as emperor as Mizunoo-no-mikado or Minoo-tei.

Events of Seiwa's life
Originally under the guardianship of his maternal grandfather Fujiwara no Yoshifusa, he displaced Imperial Prince Koretaka (惟喬親王) as Crown Prince.  Upon the death of his father in 858, Emperor Montoku, he became Emperor at the age of 9, but the real power was held by his grandfather, Yoshifusa.

 7 October 858 (Ten'an 2, 27th day of the 8th month): In the 8th year of Montoku-tennōs reign (文徳天皇8年), the emperor died; and the succession (senso) was received by his son.  Shortly thereafter, Emperor Seiwa is said to have acceded to the throne (sokui).
 15 December 858 (Ten'an 2, 7th day of the 11th month): The emperor's official announcement of his enthronement at age 9 was accompanied by the appointment of his grandfather as regent (sesshō).  This is the first time that this high honor has been accorded to a member of the Fujiwara family, and it is also the first example in Japan of the accession of an heir who is too young to be emperor.  The proclamation of the beginning of Seiwa's reign was made at the Kotaijingu at Ise Province and at all the tombs of the imperial family.
 859 (Jōgan 1, 1st month): All New Year's festivities were suspended because of the period of national mourning for the death of Emperor Montoku.
 859 (Jōgan 1): Construction began on the Iwashimizu Shrine near Heian-kyō.  This shrine honors Hachiman, the Shinto war god.
 869 (Jōgan 10): Yōzei was born, and he was named Seiwa's heir in the following year.
 876 (Jōgan 17, 11th month): In the 18th year of Seiwa-tennō"s reign (清和天皇18年), the emperor ceded his throne to his five-year-old son, which meant that the young child received the succession (senso).  Shortly thereafter, Emperor Yōzei formally acceded to the throne (sokui).
 878 (Gangyō 2):  Seiwa became a Buddhist priest.  His new priestly name was Soshin (素真).
 7 January 881 (Gangyō 4, 4th day of the 12th month): Former-Emperor Seiwa died at age 30.

Mausoleum

The actual site of Seiwa's grave is known. The emperor is traditionally venerated at the misasagi memorial shrine in the Ukyō-ku ward of Kyoto. The Imperial Household Agency designates this location as Seiwa's mausoleum. The kami of Emperor Seiwa is venerated at the Seiwatennō-sha in close proximity to the mausoleum.

Kugyō
 is a collective term for the very few most powerful men attached to the court of the Emperor of Japan in pre-Meiji eras.

In general, this elite group included only three to four men at a time.  These were hereditary courtiers whose experience and background would have brought them to the pinnacle of a life's career.  During Seiwa's reign, this apex of the Daijō-kan included:
 Sesshō, Fujiwara no Yoshifusa, 804–872.
 Daijō-daijin, Fujiwara no Yoshifusa.
 Sadaijin, Minamoto no Makoto (源信).
 Sadaijin, Minamoto no Tooru (源融).
 Udaijin, Fujiwara no Yoshimi (藤原良相), 817–867.
 Udaijin, Fujiwara no Ujimune (藤原氏宗).
 Udaijin, Fujiwara no Mototsune, 836–891.
 Naidaijin Dainagon, Fujiwara no Mototsune.

Eras of Seiwa's reign
The years of Seiwa's reign are more specifically identified by more than one era name or nengō.
 Jōgan  (859–877)

Consorts and children
Consort (Nyōgo) later Kōtaigō: Fujiwara no Takako (藤原高子; 842–910) later Nijo-kisaki (二条后), Fujiwara no Nagara's daughter
First Son: Imperial Prince Sadaakira (貞明親王) later Emperor Yōzei
Fourth Son: Imperial Prince Sadayasu (貞保親王; 870–924)
Third/Fifth daughter: Imperial Princess Atsuko (敦子内親王; d. 930), 7th Saiin in Kamo Shrine 877–880

Consort (Nyōgo): Fujiwara no Tamiko (藤原多美子; d. 886), Fujiwara no Yoshimi's daughter

Consort (Nyōgo): Taira no Kanshi (平寛子)

Consort (Nyōgo): Princess Kashi (嘉子女王)

Consort (Nyōgo): Minamoto no Sadako (源貞子; d. 873)

Consort (Nyōgo): Princess Ryūshi (隆子女王)

Consort (Nyōgo): Princess Kenshi (兼子女王)

Consort (Nyōgo): Princess Chūshi/Tadako (忠子女王; 854–904), Emperor Kōkō's daughter

Consort (Nyōgo): Fujiwara no Yoriko (藤原頼子; d. 936), Fujiwara no Mototsune's daughter
Consort (Nyōgo): Fujiwara no Kazuko (藤原佳珠子; b. 856), Fujiwara no Mototsune's daughter
Seventh Son: Imperial Prince Sadatoki (貞辰親王; 874–929)

Consort (Nyōgo): Minamoto no Takeko/Izuko (源厳子; d. 879), Minamoto no Yoshiari's daughter

Consort (Nyōgo): Minamoto no Seishi (源済子), Emperor Montoku's daughter

Consort (Nyōgo): Minamoto no Kenshi/Atsuko (源喧子)

Consort (Nyōgo): Minamoto no Gishi/Yoshiko (源宜子), Minamoto no Okimoto's daughter

Court Attendant (Koui): Ariwara no Fumiko (在原文子), Ariwara no Yukihira's daughter
Eighth Son: Imperial Prince Sadakazu (貞数親王; 875–916)
Imperial Princess Kaneko (包子内親王; d. 889)

Court Attendant (Koui): Fujiwara no Yoshichika's daughter
Imperial Prince Sadahira (貞平親王; d. 914)
Imperial Princess Shikiko (識子内親王; 874–906), 21st Saiō (Imperial Princess serving at Ise Grand Shrine) 877–880

Court Attendant (Koui): Tachibana no Yasukage's daughter (d. 924)
Imperial Prince Sadakata (貞固親王; 868–930)

Court Attendant (Koui): Fujiwara no Nakamune's daughter
third Son: Imperial Prince Sadamoto (貞元親王; 870-910)

Court Attendant (Koui): Prince Munesada's daughter
Sixth Son: Imperial Prince Sadasumi (貞純親王; 873–916) – father of Minamoto no Tsunemoto, founder of the Seiwa Genji, from whom the Kamakura shogunate, Ashikaga shogunate and the Tokugawa shogunate descend.

Court Attendant (Koui): Fujiwara no Sadamune's daughter
Imperial Prince Sadayori (貞頼親王; 876–922)

Court Attendant (Koui): Fujiwara no Morofuji's daughter
Imperial Prince Sadazane (貞真親王; 876–932)

Court Attendant (Koui): Fujiwara no Morokazu's daughter
Imperial Princess Mōshi (孟子内親王; d. 901)

Court Attendant (Koui): Saeki no Sanefusa's daughter
Minamoto no Nagami (源長鑒)
Minamoto no Nagayori (源長頼; b. 875)

Court Attendant (Koui): Ben-no-miyasundokoro (弁の御息所), Ōe no Otondo's daughter

Court lady: Kamo no Mineo's daughter
Minamoto no Naganori (源長猷; d. 918)
Minamoto no Saishi/Noriko (源載子)

Court lady: Ōno no Takatori's daughter
Minamoto no Nagafuchi (源長淵)

Ancestry

Notes

References
 Brown, Delmer M. and Ichirō Ishida, eds. (1979).  Gukanshō: The Future and the Past. Berkeley: University of California Press. ;  
 Ponsonby-Fane, Richard Arthur Brabazon. (1959).  The Imperial House of Japan. Kyoto: Ponsonby Memorial Society. 
 Titsingh, Isaac. (1834). Nihon Ōdai Ichiran''; ou,  Annales des empereurs du Japon.  Paris: Royal Asiatic Society, Oriental Translation Fund of Great Britain and Ireland.  
 Varley, H. Paul. (1980).  Jinnō Shōtōki: A Chronicle of Gods and Sovereigns. New York: Columbia University Press. ;

See also
 Emperor of Japan
 List of Emperors of Japan
 Nihon Sandai Jitsuroku　Corresponding to three reign of Emperor Seiwa, Yōzei, and Kōkō. 
 Gion Matsuri　Said to have originated during the reign of Emperor Seiwa (r. 858–876).
 Imperial cult
 Emperor Go-Mizunoo

 
 

Japanese emperors
850 births
881 deaths
People of Heian-period Japan
9th-century rulers in Asia
9th-century Japanese monarchs
Heian period Buddhist clergy
Japanese Buddhist monarchs
Japanese retired emperors
People from Kyoto